Mississippi ex rel. Hood v. AU Optronics Corp., 571 U.S. 161 (2014), was a United States Supreme Court case in which the Court determined whether a class-action suit was properly removed to federal district court as a mass action under the Class Action Fairness Act.  The court unanimously determined (Justice Sotomayor delivering the court's opinion) that since the state of Mississippi was the sole plaintiff in the lawsuit, the case did not constitute a mass action for the purposes of the Act.

The case turned on a question of statutory construction. The Act defined a mass action as 'any civil action ... in which monetary relief claims of 100 or more persons are proposed to be tried jointly on the ground that the plaintiffs’ claims involve common questions of law or fact'. The State of Mississippi sought restitution from a liquid crystal display (LCD) manufacturer, including restitution for purchases of LCD products made by Mississippi citizens.  The court held that the reference in the Act to '100 or more persons' referred to actual plaintiffs and not to any individuals (in this case, unnamed Mississippi citizens) who may have an interest in, or benefit from, the action.

References

External links
 

2014 in United States case law
United States tort case law
United States Supreme Court cases of the Roberts Court
United States Supreme Court cases